Chandranagar may refer to the following places:
 Chandranagar, Palakkad  district, Kerala
 Chandranagar, Dahanu, Maharashtra
 Chandranagar, Chhatarpur district, Madhya Pradesh
 Chandranagar, Ratnagiri  district, Maharashtra
 Chandranagar, Lucknow  district, Uttar Pradesh
 Chandernagore, West Bengal; now known as Chandannagar